Gliese 69 is a star located in the constellation of Cassiopeia. It has an apparent magnitude of 8.40. Parallax measurements by Hipparcos put it at a distance of 44.3 light-years (13.6 parsecs) away.

Gliese 69 is a K-type main-sequence star that is smaller and less massive than the Sun. It glows with an effective temperature of 4,312 K. It is around 6.9 billion years old, significantly older than the Sun. Gliese 69 is also known by its designations HD 14036 and LHS 1291.

Planetary System

In 2019 one candidate planet been detected by the radial velocity method.

References 

Cassiopeia (constellation)
K-type main-sequence stars
Durchmusterung objects
0069
010436
008070